Ex parte Garland, 71 U.S. (4 Wall.) 333 (1866), was an important United States Supreme Court case involving the disbarment of former Confederate officials.

Background
In January 1865, the US Congress passed a law that effectively disbarred former members of the Confederate government by requiring a loyalty oath to be recited by any federal court officer that affirmed that the officer had never served in the Confederate government. 

Augustus Hill Garland, an attorney and a former Confederate Senator from Arkansas, subsequently received a pardon from US President Andrew Johnson. Garland then came before the court and pleaded that the act of Congress was a bill of attainder and an ex post facto law, which unfairly punished him for the crime for which he had been pardoned, and so was unconstitutional.

Decision
In a 5–4 decision, the Supreme Court ruled that the law was both a bill of attainder and an ex post facto law. The court also ruled that the president can exercise the pardon power at any time after the commission of the crime, and that Garland was beyond the reach of punishment of any kind because of his prior presidential pardon.

The court also stated that counselors are officers of the court, not officers of the United States, and that their removal was an exercise of judicial power, not legislative power. The law was struck down as unconstitutional, which opened the way for former Confederate government officials to return to positions in the federal judiciary.

Notes

External links

 

1866 in United States case law
United States Supreme Court cases of the Chase Court
United States clemency case law
United States Constitution Article One case law
United States ex post facto case law
Reconstruction Era
United States Supreme Court cases